William Robert Young PC(Ire) (c.1856 – 12 September 1933) was an Irish linen merchant, politician and philanthropist.

Young was born at Galgorm Castle, Ballymena, County Antrim. He was educated at Harrow School and then joined the family firm of J. & R. Young of Belfast. A prominent Unionist, he was appointed to the Privy Council of Ireland in the honours for the opening of the Parliament of Northern Ireland in July 1921 for his charitable work, entitling him to the style "The Right Honourable".

Footnotes

References
Obituary, The Times, 13 September 1933

External links
 

1933 deaths
People from Ballymena
People educated at Harrow School
20th-century Irish businesspeople
19th-century Irish philanthropists
Members of the Privy Council of Ireland
Ulster Unionist Party politicians
Year of birth uncertain
20th-century Irish philanthropists